Marigot is a quartier of Terre-de-Haut Island, located in Îles des Saintes archipelago in the Caribbean. It is located in the northeastern part of the island. It is a residential area. The stadium, the middle school, and the Gendarmerie Nationale office are located on this place. In the past it was a big salt pond. The Bay of Marigot is one of the famous beach of the island.  

Populated places in Îles des Saintes
Quartiers of Îles des Saintes